Tushhan (also Tushan, or Tušhan) is a Kurdish village known as  or  by residents. It was an ancient city in Mesopotamia and was a provincial capital in the upper Tigris river valley, on the south bank and inhabited since the Mitanni period, and mainly during the Neo-Assyrian period during the Iron Age.

It is now believed to be located at the site of the modern Ziyaret Tepe, Diyarbakır Province, Turkey.

History
The site of Ziyaret Tepe was occupied as early as the Early Bronze Age. Most of the urban development uncovered to date is from the Middle Iron Age, when the city was rebuilt after its collapse at the end of the Middle Assyrian period. In late Assyrian times it was known as Tushhan, until circa 612 BC to 605 BC, when that empire fell. The site was also occupied in a much smaller scale in the Hellenistic, Roman, Medieval and Ottoman periods. The site is expected to be inundated by the Ilısu Dam around 2014.

Archaeology
Work at the location began with 3 years of surface survey and remote sensing in 1997

From 2000 until 2014 the site was being excavated by a team directed by Timothy Matney of the University of Akron.

An important assemblage of cuneiform clay tablets was found there, translated by Simo Parpola of Helsinki University.

Controversial Neo-Assyrian tablet
A cuneiform tablet was discovered in 2009 at Ziyaret Tepe that contained a list of around 60 names. It was a list of women deported from an unknown location around 800 BC, during the Neo Assyrian Empire period. According to John MacGinnis of the University of Cambridge McDonald Institute for Archaeological Research, these women may have come from around the Zagros Mountains. He said that the most likely possibility was that these names belonged to Shubrians, a people speaking a dialect of Hurrian. This contention received little support.

Üçtepe

Ziyaret Tepe is quite close to the town of Üçtepe, located near Bismil, where in 1861 John George Taylor found the famous Kurkh Monoliths, Assyrian monuments that contain a description of the Battle of Qarqar — of interest to biblical and Ancient Near East studies. In fact, Üçtepe was believed to have been the location of Tushan by some scholars in the past. Today the monoliths are located at the British Museum.

See also
Cities of the ancient Near East
Short chronology timeline

Notes

References
Timothy Matney and Ann Donkin, Mapping the Past: An Archaeogeophysical Case Study from Southeastern Turkey, Near Eastern Archaeology, vol. 69, pp. 12–26, 2006
Timothy, Matney et al., Eighteen years on the frontiers of Assyria: the Ziyaret Tepe Archaeological Project, EUT Edizioni Università di Trieste, 2020  e

External links
Ziyaret Tepe Archaeological Project website
Ziyaret Tepe page at Cambridge
How archaeologists discovered an ancient Assyrian city – and lost it again The Guardian 7 Feb 2018

Archaeological sites in Southeastern Anatolia
Ancient Assyrian cities
Former populated places in Turkey
History of Diyarbakır Province
Geography of Diyarbakır Province